Ervin Ollik (18 July 1915 – 28 June 1996) was an Estonian football player.

External links
 

1915 births
1996 deaths
People from the Governorate of Estonia
Estonian footballers
Estonia international footballers
Association football forwards